Kazimierz Nowak (11 January 1897 in Stryj  – 13 October 1937 in Poznań) was a Polish traveler, correspondent, reporter and photographer.

Life
Born in Stryj, Nowak lived in Poznań following World War I. From 1931 to 1936, he traveled alone, by bicycle, on foot, on horse, by boat and on camel across Africa, covering a distance of 40,000 km from Libya to Cape Agulhas, South Africa and back to Algeria. He died in Poznań from pneumonia as a consequence of emaciation of the body due to travel, malaria, and leg surgery.
Photographs from his African travel were published in Poland in 1962 on the album Przez Czarny Ląd (Across the Black Land). The book was edited by Nowak's daughter Elżbieta Nowak-Gliszewska and photographs were selected after consultation with professors Jan Czekanowski and Jerzy Loth.
Kazimierz Nowak's accounts of the travel were first published jointly only as late as 2000, in a book entitled Rowerem i pieszo przez Czarny Ląd (Across the Dark Continent). The Polish reporter Ryszard Kapuściński said in 2006 that it "is an utterly exceptional book", and added that: 
Its content and the personality of the writer account for its compelling nature. As such, it should command greater attention and wider recognition. This incredible story unfailingly features in my lectures, discussions and commentaries on international affairs. I ardently hope that it will take place among the classics of Polish reportage.

National Geographic Traveler (Polish edition) wrote that "Kazimierz Nowak is without a doubt a master of travel reportage".
On 25 November 2006, in the Hall of Poznań Main Railway Station where Nowak began and ended his travel, Ryszard Kapuściński unveiled a commemorative plaque dedicated to Nowak.

The 7th extended Polish edition of the book was published in 2013. The book was translated into Hungarian language in 2014 (Kerékpárral és gyalog a fekete földrészen át) and into English in 2017 (Across The Dark Continent. Bicycle Diaries from Africa, 1931–1936).

In 2011 Jacek Y. Łuczak wrote Nowak's biography Polska Kazimierza Nowaka. Przewodnik rowerzysty (Kazimierz Nowak's Poland. A Cyclist's Guidebook). The book describes places in Poland Nowak visited during his 4 bicycle travels in the years 1925–1930 (1925–1926: around Europe; 1927–1928: Europe and North Africa; 1928: around Poland; 1930: Southern Poland and Western Europe).

In 2014 the first volume of Nowak's letters from African travel to his wife was published in Poland as Kochana Maryś! Listy z Afryki. The second volume was published in 2015 and the third in 2016. The last volume is expected to be published in 2017.

References

External links

 Polish website dedicated to Kazimierz Nowak, with his biography in English, German, French, Italian and Arabic
 The map of Kazimierz Nowak's travel in Africa (1931-36)
 Long-Distance Cyclist Kazimierz Nowak (Adventure Journal, 8 January 2016)
 Reports of the initiative of groups of young people cycling in turns along the route of his travel, 2009-2012 (in Polish)
 Story on Kazimierz Nowak with images
 By bicycle and on foot across the Dark Continent - 2013, 7th extended edition (Polish)
 Nowak's books and souvenirs

Video
 The memorial to Kazimierz Nowak was unveiled in Poznań in November 2006 by Ryszard Kapuściński (Polish TVP3 footage)

1897 births
1937 deaths
Polish photographers
Polish travel writers
Polish reporters and correspondents
Writers from Poznań